This list of 1971 motorsport champions is a list of national or international auto racing series with a Championship decided by the points or positions earned by a driver from multiple races.

Formula cars

Sports car

Touring car

Stock car racing

Rallying

Motorcycle

See also
 List of motorsport championships
 Auto racing

1971 in motorsport
1971